Balçılı may refer to:
 Balçılı, Goygol, Azerbaijan
 Balçılı, Yevlakh, Azerbaijan